The list of ship commissionings in 1980 includes a chronological list of all ships commissioned in 1980.


See also 

1980